Matapan may refer to:

 Cape Matapan, southernmost point of mainland Greece
 Battle of Cape Matapan, naval battle of 1941
 Battle of Matapan, naval battle of 1717
 HMS Matapan (D43), battle-class fleet destroyer of the Royal Navy

See also
 Matapang
 Mattapan, Massachusetts
Hembree House, Windsor, California, also known as Mattapan